Shio Batmanishvili (in Georgian: შიო ბათმანიშვილი, born in 1885 in Akhaltsikhe, Tiflis Governorate, Russian Empire – November 1, 1937, Sandarmokh, Karelia, Russian Soviet Federative Socialist Republic) was a Georgian Greek Catholic, both a hieromonk and the superior of the Servites of the Immaculate Conception, a survivor of the Gulag at Solovki prison camp, and a martyr during Joseph Stalin's Great Purge.

Biography
Batmanishvili was born in 1885 in Akhaltsikhe, in the Tiflis Governorate of the Russian Empire (today in Georgia). He studied at the Seminary of Constantinople and later theology in Rome, being ordained a priest in 1912. He initially exercised his ministry at Kutaisi and Akhaltsikhe, and from 1922 he was superior of the Servites of the Immaculate Conception's monastery at Our Lady of Lourdes Church in Constantinople.

In 1925, Batmanishvili was received by Pope Pius XI, along with a group of Eastern Catholic priests, and was appointed Apostolic Administrator (other sources indicate that he was also appointed Exarch) for the Georgian Greek Catholic Church.

On 16 October 1927, Batmanishvili was arrested in Tbilisi and on 16 January 1928 he was sentenced to ten years of hard labor without the possibility of amnesty, under Articles 58-6 and 58-12 of the penal code of the RSFSR, and was sent to the Solovki prison camp, where he arrived on February 12. 
In July 1932, he was accused of anti-Soviet agitation, participating in secret liturgies and religious rituals, and transmitting information abroad on the persecution of Catholics in the USSR. As a result he was isolated from the rest of the prisoners. In May 1935, Batmanishvili was transferred to work on the Kirov railroad, and in June 1936, he returned to Solovki. On 14 October 1937, he was sentenced to death by the Directorate of the NKVD and executed on November 1, 1937 in Medvezhegorsk and buried at Sandormokh.

References

External links
Book of Remembrance: Biographies of Catholic Clergy and Laity Repressed in the Soviet Union - Biography of Father Shio Batmanishvili

1885 births
1937 deaths
20th-century Eastern Catholic martyrs
Catholic people executed by the Soviet Union
Catholic priests from Georgia (country)
Eastern Catholic monks
Eastern Catholic priests
Georgian Byzantine-Rite Catholics
Inmates of Solovki prison camp
People executed by the Soviet Union by firearm
People who died in the Gulag